In geometry, the order-7 triangular tiling is a regular tiling of the hyperbolic plane with a Schläfli symbol of {3,7}.

Hurwitz surfaces 

The symmetry group of the tiling is the (2,3,7) triangle group, and a fundamental domain for this action is the (2,3,7) Schwarz triangle. This is the smallest hyperbolic Schwarz triangle, and thus, by the proof of Hurwitz's automorphisms theorem, the tiling is the universal tiling that covers all Hurwitz surfaces (the Riemann surfaces with maximal symmetry group), giving them a triangulation whose symmetry group equals their automorphism group as Riemann surfaces.

The smallest of these is the Klein quartic, the most symmetric genus 3 surface, together with a tiling by 56 triangles, meeting at 24 vertices, with symmetry group the simple group of order 168, known as PSL(2,7). The resulting surface can in turn be polyhedrally immersed into Euclidean 3-space, yielding the small cubicuboctahedron.

The dual order-3 heptagonal tiling has the same symmetry group, and thus yields heptagonal tilings of Hurwitz surfaces.

Related polyhedra and tiling 
It is related to two star-tilings by the same vertex arrangement: the order-7 heptagrammic tiling, {7/2,7}, and heptagrammic-order heptagonal tiling, {7,7/2}.

This tiling is topologically related as a part of sequence of regular polyhedra with Schläfli symbol {3,p}.

This tiling is a part of regular series {n,7}:

From a Wythoff construction there are eight hyperbolic uniform tilings that can be based from the regular heptagonal tiling. 

Drawing the tiles colored as red on the original faces, yellow at the original vertices, and blue along the original edges, there are 8 forms.

See also

Order-7 tetrahedral honeycomb
List of regular polytopes
List of uniform planar tilings
Tilings of regular polygons
Triangular tiling
Uniform tilings in hyperbolic plane

References

 John H. Conway, Heidi Burgiel, Chaim Goodman-Strass, The Symmetries of Things 2008,  (Chapter 19, The Hyperbolic Archimedean Tessellations)

External links 

 Hyperbolic and Spherical Tiling Gallery
 KaleidoTile 3: Educational software to create spherical, planar and hyperbolic tilings
 Hyperbolic Planar Tessellations, Don Hatch

Hyperbolic tilings
Isogonal tilings
Isohedral tilings
Order-7 tilings
Regular tilings
Triangular tilings